Tourist Police may refer to:

 Tourist Police (Bangladesh), branch of the Bangladesh Police responsible for investigating crimes against tourists
 Tourist Police (Malaysia), unit of the Royal Malaysian Police providing tourists and visitors information on the local community
 Tourist Police (Thailand), department of the Royal Thai Police that cooperates with foreign nationals and promotes their security